Youngiibacter fragilis is a Gram-negative, non-spore-forming, rod-shaped and non-motile bacterium from the genus of Youngiibacter.

References

Clostridiaceae
Bacteria described in 2014
Bacillota